Town Centre is a major MTR Light Rail stop. It is located at ground level at Tuen Mun Heung Sze Wui Road in Tuen Mun Town Centre, Tuen Mun District, Hong Kong. It began service on 18 September 1988 and belongs to Zone 2.

Unlike other intermediate stops in the Light Rail system, a total of four platforms were constructed at Town Centre stop, due to the high level of passenger demand associated with its location within the Tuen Mun town centre proper. It has footbridges linking Tuen Mun Park, Trend Plaza, Tuen Mun Town Plaza and a bus terminus.

References

MTR Light Rail stops
Former Kowloon–Canton Railway stations
Tuen Mun
Railway stations in Hong Kong opened in 1988